Mangala Bansode is an Indian Tamasha folk artist popularly known as ‘Sangeetachi Rani’, from the Maharashtra & She is daughter of the Vithabai Bhau Mang Narayangaonkar, she has won the Vithabai Narayangaonkar Lifetime Achievement Award awarded by government of Maharashtra. She works along with her son NItin, who is fifth generation of her family in the line. It has been said that she is the only woman owner of a tamasha troupe named Loknatya Tamasha Mandal in Maharashtra. She is from the Village of Karawadi near Karad. Her troupe has 150 persons in employment.

Anecdotes 
In January 2016 just before her performance in the Goa Lokotsav, a rumour spread about her death that she had to scotch by going to press. In the 2013 season her troupe received the biggest payment advances amongst all at Narayangaon's tamasha fair. It is said that Bansode's granddaughter a doctor had to disassociate herself with her grandmother's profession in order to improve her matrimonial situation, however she wishes her granddaughter Sayali - her son Nitin's daughter to be the sixth generation performing.

References 

Living people
Indian musical theatre actresses
1954 births